Futures End is an American progressive metal band based in California, formed by guitarists Christian Wentz and Marc Pattison.

Once their first few demos were completed, Fred Marshall, formerly of progressive metal band Zero Hour, was chosen to be their vocalist for his powerful vocals and great melodic sense. Shortly thereafter, bassist Steve Di Giorgio (Death, Sadus, Iced Earth) and drummer Jon Allen (Testament, Sadus) came on board to complete Futures End.

Their music has been compared to bands such as Symphony X, Testament, and Alice in Chains.

The band's debut album, Memoirs of a Broken Man, was released in October 2009 under Nightmare Records to considerable critical acclaim from the heavy metal community. That same year, the album was voted 'Best Progressive Metal Album of 2009' in USA Progressive Music Magazine's annual poll, beating fellow contestants Redemption, Shadow Gallery, Edgend, and progressive metal giants Dream Theater.

Members

Current 
Fred Marshall – vocals
Steve Di Giorgio – bass
Marc Pattison – guitars
Christian Wentz – guitars
Jon Allen – drums

Former 
Larry Smith – bass

Discography 
2009: Memoirs of a Broken Man

References

External links 

USA Prog Music Interview

Heavy metal musical groups from California
American progressive metal musical groups